Barbara Nichol (born c. 1956) is a Canadian writer.

She was born in Vancouver, British Columbia, the daughter of John Lang Nichol and Elizabeth Fellowes, founder of the Equinox Gallery, and was educated at Westcot Elementary School and Crofton House School in Vancouver, at Elmwood School in Ottawa, The Branson School in Ross, California and St Clare's, Oxford. She attended the University of Toronto and the University of British Columbia but did not graduate from either. She has written and produced over 25  radio documentaries for the Canadian Broadcasting Corporation and has written comedy and humour for radio, magazines and television. Nichol wrote scripts for the Canadian version of Sesame Street from 1985 to 1994 and worked as a script editor  on the international edition of the show.

In 1996, she won a Genie Award and a Golden Spire Award for Best Short Film under 15 minutes for The Home for Blind Women.

She was a founding editor of the Canadian magazine The Walrus.

Barbara wrote the book and lyrics (music by Tom Bellman) for the Canadian musical "The Sparrow Songs: A Country Song String" which was featured at The Summerworks Festival in August 2011, ran at Hugh's Room in Toronto and the Festival of Ideas and Creation at Canadian Stage in 2012.

She has received a Canadian Juno award, for her original, multi platinum recording of Beethoven Lives Upstairs, a Canal + award for The Home For Blind Women, has been a Governor General's Award finalist for her children's book Dippers'and won the Mr. Christie Prize for "Biscuits in The Cupboard", a book of verse'. She was nominated for a Juno Award as well for producing and directing the children's play series "A Story For A Child." The series was released as a recording by BMI.

She received an Emmy nomination for her Sesame Street special "Basil Hears a Noise."

Her sisters are Marjorie Nichol, a radio producer and journalist, most recently the executive producer of the Canadian Broadcasting Corporation's "Sunday Edition", and Sarah Milroy, a prominent critic and writer on the visual arts, now the Head Curator of the McMichael Gallery.

 Selected books 
 Beethoven lives upstairs (1989),  Beethoven Lives Upstairs was later published as a book, written by Nichol.
 Biscuits in the cupboard (1997) (Verse) illustrated by Philippe Béha, received a Mr. Christie's Book Award. 
 Dippers (1997) illustrated by Barry Moser, appeared on the short list for the Toronto Book Awards and was also nominated for a Governor General's Literary Award
 One Small Garden Trunks All Aboard: An Elephant ABC.''
 Safe and Sound (a book of verse.)
 Tales Of Don Quixote (a retelling for Children)
 Tales of Don Quixote. Book Two.
 The Lady from Kent. (Verse, published in 2018)

References

External links 

 

Year of birth missing (living people)
Living people
Canadian women children's writers
Canadian women screenwriters
Writers from Vancouver